The 1997 NCAA Women's Gymnastics championship involved 12 schools competing for the national championship of women's NCAA Division I gymnastics.  It was the sixteenth NCAA gymnastics national championship and the defending NCAA Team Champion for 1996 was Alabama.  The competition took place in Gainesville, Florida, hosted by the University of Florida in the O'Connell Center. The 1997 Championship was won by UCLA, their first title and the first title not won by Utah, Georgia or Alabama.

Team Results

Session 1

Session 2

Super Six

External links
  Gym Results

NCAA Women's Gymnastics championship
NCAA Women's Gymnastics Championship